Secreted frizzled-related protein 4 is a protein that in humans is encoded by the SFRP4 gene.

Function 

Secreted frizzled-related protein 4 (SFRP4) is a member of the SFRP family that contains a cysteine-rich domain homologous to the putative Wnt-binding site of Frizzled proteins. SFRPs act as soluble modulators of Wnt signaling. The expression of SFRP4 in ventricular myocardium correlates with apoptosis related gene expression.

Biallelic, recessive variants in the SFRP4 gene result in the genetic disorder of bone, Pyle disease, that is characterized by a failure of long bone remodeling with increased fragility. The association between SFRP4 deficiency and Pyle disease has highlighted the importance of SFRP4 in the formation of the bone cortex, and of the importance of bone cortex for the mechanical stability of long bone elements.

SFRP4 is a hub gene in a Type 2 Diabetes-associated gene coexpression module in human islets, and reduces glucose-induced insulin secretion through decreased β-cell exocytosis. Expression and release of SFRP4 from islets is enhanced by interleukin-1β. SFRP4 is elevated in serum several years before clinical diagnosis of Type 2 Diabetes. Individuals who have above-average levels of SFRP4 in the blood are five times more likely to develop diabetes in the next few years than those with below-average levels. SFRP4 concentration seems to correlate with obesity and systemic insulin resistance

References

Further reading